Zanesville Municipal Airport  is a city-owned airport six miles east of downtown Zanesville, in Muskingum County, Ohio. The National Plan of Integrated Airport Systems for 2011–2015 called it a general aviation facility.

The first airline flights were TWA DC-3s in 1947. Lake Central replaced TWA in 1953; successor Allegheny left Zanesville January 9, 1970.
The largest aircraft used on scheduled service was Allegheny Airlines Convair 580 prop jets before stopping service in 1970. Allegheny had 4 flights a day using the CV580, 2 nonstops to Columbus (CMH) with continuing service to Dayton (DAY), then Detroit (DTW). The two eastbound flights went to Wheeling WV (HLG), then Pittsburgh (PIT).

Facilities
Zanesville Municipal Airport covers 534 acres (216 ha) at an elevation of 900 feet (274 m). It has two asphalt/concrete runways: 04/22 is 5,000 by 150 feet (1,524 x 46 m) and 16/34 is 4,999 by 150 feet (1,524 x 46 m).

In the year ending May 24, 2011 the airport had 33,312 aircraft operations, average 91 per day: 96% general aviation, 3% air taxi, and 1% military. 18 aircraft were then based at the airport: 56% single-engine, 33% multi-engine, and 11.1% jet.
q

References

External links 
 Zanesville Aviation, the fixed-base operator (FBO)
 Aerial image as of April 1994 from USGS The National Map
 

Airports in Ohio
Buildings and structures in Zanesville, Ohio
Transportation in Muskingum County, Ohio